Ivan Chakarov, also known as "James Dean" of weightlifting, born 1966, is a Bulgarian world class weightlifter who won gold medals in the 91 kg class at the 1993 World Weightlifting Championships in Melbourne, Australia and in the 90 kg class at the 1991 European Weightlifting Championships in Władysławowo, Poland. He also competed in the men's middle heavyweight event at the 1992 Summer Olympics. He began training in 1979 at the Chernomorets Burgas Club. His first coach is Konstantin Darov. Chakarov competed for Chernomorets until 1985. After that, until the end of his long and successful career, he competed only for CSKA Sofia. His personal coaches were Andon Nikolov, Rumen Alexandrov and Neno Terziyski. Chakarov has set two world records.

Personal Bests

Weightlifting
Snatch: 187.5 kg
Clean and Jerk: 230 kg
Best Total: 417.5 kg (480 sinclair) (About the 10th best weightlifter ever)

Other exercises
Power Clean: 180.0 kg (Strict), 200 kg (some depth)
Back Squat: 1RM: 330.0 kg (Some sources say 350 kg, though it is likely to be inaccurate, a 335 kg value is more likely provided from other sources, but he definitely squatted 330 in the back squat). 3RM: 285 kg
Front Squat: 280.0 kg
Clean: 230.0 kg (Accomplished twice at the 1987 world weightlifting championships)
Military Press: 120.0 kg
Bench Press: 150.0 kg
Clean Pull: 290.0 kg
Power Snatch (above Parallel) : 150.0 kg
Snatch Pull: 250.0 kg
Deadlift: 310.0 kg

No-No-No Squats
Chakarov was exceptional in the Back Squat, and squatted 270 kg (595.25 lbs) for 3 deep repetitions at the 1993 World Weightlifting Championships.  This feat became well known as the "No-No-No" squat, as Chakarov did not use a lifting belt, knee wraps, or spotters for this attempt.

References

External links
Ivan Chakarov Biography and Olympic Results

Living people
1966 births
Bulgarian male weightlifters
Olympic weightlifters of Bulgaria
Weightlifters at the 1992 Summer Olympics
European champions in weightlifting
World record setters in weightlifting
European Weightlifting Championships medalists
World Weightlifting Championships medalists
20th-century Bulgarian people